The 1876 Ipswich by-election was fought on 1 January 1876.  The by-election was fought due to the death of the incumbent Conservative MP, John Cobbold.  It was won by his younger brother the Conservative candidate Thomas Cobbold.

References

1876 elections in the United Kingdom
1876 in England
Ipswich
1876